José Maria Vasconcelos  (born 10 October 1956), popularly known as Taur Matan Ruak (Tetum for "Two Sharp Eyes"), is an East Timorese politician who has served as the prime minister of East Timor since 22 June 2018. He was also President of East Timor from 20 May 2012 to 20 May 2017. 

Before entering politics, he was the Commander of the FALINTIL-Forças de Defesa de Timor-Leste (F-FDTL), the military of East Timor, from 2002 until 6 October 2011. Prior to serving in the F-FDTL, he was the last commander of the Armed Forces of National Liberation of East Timor or FALINTIL (Forças Armadas para a Liberação Nacional de Timor Leste), the insurgent army that resisted the Indonesian occupation of the territory from 1975 to 1999. Leaving the military in 2011, he stood as an independent candidate in the 2012 presidential election and prevailed in the second round of the vote, held in April 2012.

Biography
On 7 December 1975, when Indonesia invaded and occupied East Timor, Taur Matan Ruak took to the hills with the recently formed FRETILIN Army, FALINTIL. As a combatant, he participated in battles against the Indonesian military in Dili, Aileu, Maubisse, Ossu, Venilale, Uatulari and finally in Laga on the northeastern coast, where he eventually stayed. Major-General Ruak's first official FALINTIL appointment was at the end of 1976. From 1976 to 1979, he rose through the FALINTIL ranks in the two eastern military sectors, the Central East Sector and the Eastern Point, or the Ponta Leste Sector.  Then he became a company commander.

Taur Matan Ruak and others regrouped the following day at the base of Monte Legumau (Monte Apara) and recommenced guerrilla operations after the collapse of the last Timorese resistance base at Matebian Mountain on 22 November 1978. He was ordered to carry out guerrilla activities in the east after the death of Commander Nicolau Lobato in December 1978. During a mission to locate survivors of the annihilation campaign, Taur Matan Ruak was captured in the Viqueque area by Indonesian Army forces on 31 March 1979. After 23 days he managed to escape and rejoin other FALINTIL forces in the mountains.

In March 1981 he was appointed Assistant Chief-of-Staff of FALINTIL, responsible for the operational command of the Eastern Sectors and later the Central Sector.  Taur Matan Ruak was promoted and made responsible for strategic planning of commando operations in the Eastern sector in March 1983.  Between 1984 and 1986 Brigadier Ruak was transferred and served as military adviser for commando operations in the Western Sector. After nearly 10 years of operational experience he was promoted to Deputy Chief-of-Staff.  After 1986, he was responsible for all commando operations throughout East Timor.

In November 1992, Commander-in-Chief Xanana Gusmão was captured in Dili. Taur Matan Ruak was promoted to Chief-of-Staff. Ruak became the Commander of FALINTIL after the death of Commander Konis Santana on 11 March 1998. Xanana Gusmão resigned from FALINTIL and Taur Matan Ruak was appointed the Commander-in-Chief of FALINTIL. With the restoration of Independence on 20 May 2002 he became the Chief of the Armed Forces (Chefe Estado Maior General Forças Armadas, CEMGFA) and was promoted to Major General in 2009.

General Ruak is married to Isabel da Costa Ferreira.

Political career
Taur Matan Ruak played a role in the 2006 East Timorese crisis. On 2 October 2006, the United Nations Independent Special Commission of Inquiry made a number of recommendations including that several individuals be prosecuted. Notably, it found that Interior Minister Rogerio Lobato, and Defence Minister Roque Rodrigues and Defence Force Chief Taur Matan Ruak acted illegally in transferring weapons to civilians during the crisis.
	
Ruak resigned from his position as commander of the F-FDTL on 1 September 2011. At the time there was speculation that he was considering running for president. Ruak stated that he would make a decision on standing for election during 2012.

He was formally decommissioned by President José Ramos-Horta on 6 October 2011.

Election as president
A presidential election was held in East Timor on 17 March and 16 April 2012 to choose a president for a five-year term. Incumbent President José Ramos-Horta, who was eligible for a second and final term as president, announced that he would seek nomination to be a candidate in the election. The election was seen as a test for the "young democracy" in seeking to take control of its own security.  Taur Matan Ruak provisionally beat Francisco Guterres in a second round runoff.

Taur Matan Ruak was sworn in as president on 20 May 2012, on the same day that East Timor marked the tenth anniversary of its independence. Both Taur Matan Ruak and José Maria Vasconcelos are official names of the President. From June 2013, he made a series of "community visits" in some of the country's most remote areas.

Resignation as prime minister

Ruak announced his intention to resign the premiership in February 2020, due to a failure to pass the budget for that year. However, he retracted his resignation in March 2020 in order to deal with the COVID-19 pandemic.

Honours
 Grand Collar of the Order of Prince Henry, Portugal (10 May 2012)
 Grand Collar of the Order of Timor-Leste, Timor-Leste (19 May 2017)

References

Further reading

External links

1956 births
Living people
East Timorese military personnel
Independent politicians in East Timor
Interior ministers of East Timor
People from Baucau District
Presidents of East Timor
Prime Ministers of East Timor
Recipients of the Order of Timor-Leste